Scrobipalpa filia is a moth in the family Gelechiidae. It was described by Povolný in 1969. It is found in Mongolia and northern Iran.

References

Scrobipalpa
Moths described in 1969
Taxa named by Dalibor Povolný